Lemyra costimacula is a moth of the family Erebidae. It was described by John Henry Leech in 1899. It is found in China (Sichuan and Yunnan).

References

 

costimacula
Moths described in 1899